In October 2018, there were incidents of attacks on Hindi-speaking migrants; from the Indian states of Uttar Pradesh, Bihar and Madhya Pradesh; in Gujarat after the alleged rape of a 14-month-old in a village near Himmatnagar in north Gujarat.

Background
The 14-months old girl from a Thakor community was allegedly raped by a muslim migrant labourer from Bihar on 28 September 2018. He worked at the ceramic factory at Dhundhar village near Himmatnagar, Sabarkantha district in north Gujarat where the incident took place. He was arrested by the police next day. It angered the Thakor community which held protests across Gujarat.

Attacks and exodus
On 2 October, a mob, allegedly led by Kshatriya Thakor Sena members, attacked on the migrant workers in a factory near Vadnagar in Mehsana district. The police had arrested the twenty people for rioting. The next day, Alpesh Thakor, a leader of Koli Thakor Sena and Indian National Congress MLA; had announced the fast from 8 October to seek justice of the rape survivor. He had reportedly demanded the preference to the local people in jobs in industries in the state while addressing the protest. He had also accused the government of filing false cases against the members of his community and demanded their release.

On 3 October, there was an attack in Chandlodiya, Ahmedabad. There were further incidents of attacks on the migrant labourers and the factories employing them by the Thakor community and others. By 7 October, the six districts were affected including Sabarkantha, Mehsana, Gandhinagar, Patan, Banaskantha, Aravalli and Ahmedabad district. The first two districts were the worst affected. The attacks were chiefly in industrial estates and industrial belts. On 8 October, there were attacks in villages near Vadodara also. No incidents of attack reported after 9 October.

The attacks triggered exodus of the more than thousand labourers from Gujarat to their native states. The Director General of Police denied the exodus and attributed the leaving migrants to the upcoming festive season. Uttar Bharatiya Vikas Parishad, an outfit supporting north Indian migrants, claimed that around 20,000 people had left Gujarat by 8 October.

Government action
By 8 October, total 55 FIRs were lodged and 431 people were arrested. Ten people were arrested for spreading  rumours and hatred on social media. The government of Gujarat provided security to more than hundred factories. Apart from State Police, seventeen companies of State Reserve Police (SRP) were deployed in the affected districts.

The Gujarat Chamber of Commerce and Industry (GCCI) urged the government to restore the peace as the industries were affected.

Political reactions
The Bharatiya Janata Party (BJP) and Indian National Congress (INC), two major political parties in Gujarat assembly, appealed for peace and harmony. The opposition INC state chief Amit Chavda reasoned the rising unemployment in youth behind the anger and criticised the attackers. INC President Rahul Gandhi called the attacks "completely wrong" and attributed it to unemployment and shutdown of the factories. 

BJP blamed Alpesh Thakor and his outfit for the violence. Alpesh Thakor denied his involvement and appealed for peace to his community. He kept "goodwill" fast in Ahmedabad for a day on 11 October. The Government of Gujarat appealed to the migrants to return. 

In July 2019, after Lok Sabha Elections, Alpesh Thakor joined BJP after quitting INC. Legitimate questions regarding his involvement in violence would disappear slowly. 

Yogi Adityanath and Nitish Kumar, the chief ministers of Uttar Pradesh and Bihar respectively, spoke with Vijay Rupani, Gujarat Chief Minister for their concerns. Tejashwi Yadav, a leader of Rashtriya Janata Dal, a opposition political party from Bihar; criticised the Central Government led by BJP leader Narendra Modi who belongs to Gujarat, alleging that BJP/RSS had "turned Gujrat into a nursery of hatred & violence against poor, dalits & minorities."

See also
2008 attacks on Uttar Pradeshi and Bihari migrants in Maharashtra

References

2018 in India
History of Gujarat (1947–present)
Crime in Gujarat
Violence in India
Anti-Bihari sentiment
Hate crimes
Racism in India
Discrimination in India
Regionalism in India